Quzluy-e Olya (also Romanized as Qūzlūy-e ‘Olyā; also known as Qowzlū-ye Bālā and Qozlū-ye ‘Olyā) is a village in Chaharduli Rural District, Keshavarz District, Shahin Dezh County, West Azerbaijan Province, Iran. At the 2006 census, its population was 236, in 42 families.

References 

Populated places in Shahin Dezh County